Whitsunday is an electoral division in the Legislative Assembly of Queensland, Queensland, Australia.

It extends from the northern suburbs of Mackay to Bowen and Proserpine as well as east to the Whitsunday Islands.

Members for Whitsunday

Election results

References

External links
 

Whitsunday
Constituencies established in 1950
1950 establishments in Australia